Dragon Lord (also known as Dragon Strike) is a 1982 Hong Kong martial arts comedy film starring and directed by Jackie Chan, who also wrote the screenplay with Edward Tang and Barry Wong. It was originally supposed to be a sequel to The Young Master and even had the name Young Master in Love until it was changed to Dragon Lord. The film was experimented by Chan with various elaborate stunt action sequences in a period setting, serving as a transition between Chan's earlier kung fu comedy period films (such as Drunken Master and The Young Master) and his later stunt-oriented modern action films (such as Project A and Police Story).

Plot
Dragon (Jackie Chan) is the son of a Chinese aristocrat who is always getting in trouble, and likes to skip his lessons. 
Dragon tries to send a love note to the girl he likes via a kite, but the kite gets away. Dragon tries to get the kite and letter back which have landed on the roof of the headquarters of a gang of thieves who are planning to steal artifacts from the towns temple. Dragon interferes with the gang’s plans and is forced to fight off the gang.

Cast
 Jackie Chan – Dragon Ho / Lung
 Mars – Cowboy Chin
 Hwang In-Shik – The Big Boss
 Tien Feng – Dragon's Father
 Paul Chang – Chin's Father
 Wai-Man Chan – Tiger (as Hui-Min Chen)
 Kang-Yeh Cheng – Ah Dee
 Fung Feng – The Referee
 Kang Ho – The Reteree
 Fung Hak-on – The Killer King (as Ke-An Fung)
 Kam-kwong Ho – The Commentator
 Pak-kwong Ho – Spectator
 Yeong-mun Kwon – The Hatchetman (as Kuen Wing-Man)
 Lei Suet – Alice (as Sidney Yim)
 Corey Yuen – Lu Chen gang member
 Mang Hoi – Lu Chen gang member
 Alan Chui Chung-San - Lu Chen gang member
 Yuan-li Wu – The Matchmaker (as Yuen-Yee Ny)
Yan Tsan Tang – Smuggler
  Po Tai – Ah Dum Pao (as Tai Do)
 Clement Yip – Thug
 Benny Lai – Braves' team player
 Johnny Cheung – Smuggler

Production
Dragon Lord went over budget and took twice as long to shoot as was originally planned due to Chan's many retakes of shots to get them exactly as he wanted them. One scene in the film is reputed to have taken 2900 takes to complete, although sources disagree on whether the scene in question is the opening scene involving a human pyramid or a sequence depicting a Jianzi game.

The opening bun festival scene was originally intended to end the film but was moved as Chan wanted a spectacular opening to the film. The final fight scene, which takes place in a barn, also featured elaborate stunts, including one where Chan does a back flip off a loft and falls to the lower ground.

According to his book I Am Jackie Chan: My Life in Action, Chan injured his chin during a stunt, making it difficult to say his lines and direct.

This is the first Jackie Chan film that includes outtakes (bloopers). Jackie Chan says that he was inspired to do this by the use of bloopers at the end of The Cannonball Run, a film in which Jackie Chan also starred. His subsequent films all include outtakes.

Release and box office
In its original Hong Kong theatrical run, Dragon Lord grossed 17,936,344. The film did not make as much as it was expected to in Hong Kong, but was a big hit in Japan. It was 1982's ninth-highest-grossing foreign film in Japan, where it grossed .

In Taiwan, it became the 14th-highest-grossing film of 1982, selling 92,957 tickets and earning  (US$152,551). In South Korea, it was the highest-grossing film of 1982, with 298,122 ticket sales in the capital Seoul City, equivalent to an estimated . In Spain (where it released in 1984), the film sold 188,958 tickets, equivalent to an estimated .

Hong Kong Legends released the DVD on 25 August 2003 in the United Kingdom. Dimension Films released the film on DVD in the U.S. on 11 May 2004.

Reception
Joey O'Bryan of The Austin Chronicle rated it 2.5/5 stars and wrote that the film, while not one of Chan's best, is an early attempt to take the genre into a new direction and set the stage for many of Chan's better, more-realized films.  O'Bryan highlighted the film's climactic fight as a "worth the price of admission all by itself".  TV Guide rated it 3/5 stars and wrote, "Aside from the meandering, stop-and-go screenplay, there's much to admire about the film."  John Sinnott of DVD Talk rated it 3.5/5 stars called it a "fun movie" that moves away from conventional martial arts films.

Awards and nominations
 1983 Hong Kong Film Awards:
 Nomination: Best Action Choreography (Jackie Chan, Fung Hak-on, Corey Yuen Kwai)

See also
 Jackie Chan filmography
 List of Hong Kong films
 List of martial arts films

References

External links
 Dragon Lord at Hong Kong Cinemagic
 
 

1982 films
1982 martial arts films
1980s Cantonese-language films
1980s martial arts comedy films
Hong Kong martial arts comedy films
Kung fu films
Wushu films
Golden Harvest films
Films directed by Jackie Chan
1980s Hong Kong films